The 2023 U Sports football season will begin on the weekend of August 26, 2023, with ten Ontario University Athletics teams opening their schedules that day. The Atlantic University Sport, Canada West, and RSEQ conferences have not yet announced their schedules.

The conference championships will be played on the weekend of November 11, 2023, and the season will conclude on November 25, 2023, with the 58th Vanier Cup championship. The location of the championship game has yet to be announced. 27 university teams in Canada are scheduled to play U Sports football, the highest level of amateur Canadian football.

Schedules
On January 19, 2023, the OUA released their schedule which featured no major changes from the 2022 season, with 11 teams playing eight regular season games over nine weeks. The regular season will start on August 26, 2023, and end on October 21, 2023. Seven teams will qualify for the playoffs, which begin on October 28, 2023, with the top seed having a first-round bye. The 115th Yates Cup game is scheduled to be played on November 11, 2023.

Regular season

Standings

Post-season 
The Vanier Cup is played between the champions of the Mitchell Bowl and the Uteck Bowl, the national semi-final games. In 2023, according to the rotating schedule, the Atlantic conference's Loney Bowl championship team will visit the Canada West Hardy Trophy winners for the Mitchell Bowl. The Yates Cup Ontario conference championship team will visit the Québec conference Dunsmore Cup winners for the Uteck Bowl. These games are scheduled to be played on November 18, 2023 while the Vanier Cup is scheduled to be played on November 25, 2023.

References

External links
 Official website

2023 in Canadian football
U Sports football seasons